Mark David Cooper (born 5 April 1967) is an English former footballer. He began his career with Cambridge United before joining Tottenham Hotspur in 1987. He failed to break into the Spurs first team and joined Gillingham in 1987 for a fee of £102,500. This was a club record for Gillingham but his spell at Priestfield Stadium was unsuccessful and he came to be regarded as a high-priced flop for the Kent club. He moved on to Leyton Orient in 1989 and later played for Barnet, Northampton Town and Peterborough United before finishing his career in non-league football.

References

1967 births
Living people
English footballers
Gillingham F.C. players
Cambridge United F.C. players
Tottenham Hotspur F.C. players
Shrewsbury Town F.C. players
Leyton Orient F.C. players
Barnet F.C. players
Northampton Town F.C. players
Peterborough United F.C. players
Welling United F.C. players
Ebbsfleet United F.C. players
Footballers from Hertfordshire
Sportspeople from Watford
Association football forwards